Mohabbat may refer to:
 Mohabbat (1943 film), a Hindi film by Phani Majumdar
 Mohabbat (1985 film), a Bollywood film by Bapu
 Mohabbat (1997 film), a Bollywood film starring Sanjay Kapoor, Madhuri Dixit and Akshay Khanna
 Mohabbath (2011 film), a Malayalam film starring Meera Jasmine, Anand Michael and Munna
Malayalam-language title of Yehh Jadu Hai Jinn Ka!,  an Indian fantasy television series